The Diary of a Wimpy Kid franchise contains a large cast of characters. It centers on protagonist Greg Heffley, his best friend Rowley Jefferson, and Greg's family: his mother Susan, father Frank, and brothers Rodrick and Manny.

Main characters

Greg Heffley

Gregory "Greg" Heffley is 12 years old. Greg's actions can be antagonistic at times, including terrorizing kids, trying to steal money from a church collection basket, lying in compulsion, picking on other students, playing pranks on his best friend, selling falsely advertised "fitness water," and praying for bad things to happen to others. He also is a very bad friend. However, he also demonstrates a degree of kindness in some of his actions. He helps his brother with his homework, gets his friend a date for a dance, and forgives his friends.
 
In the film series, Greg is portrayed by Zachary Gordon in the first three films, and Jason Drucker in The Long Haul and by Brady Noon in the animated films.

Rowley Jefferson
Roland "Rowley" Jefferson is Greg's best friend. In the first book, Rowley is 11 years old and a person to play pranks on in Greg's point of view while technically in a third-person view, Greg is the antagonist and Rowley is the protagonist. Rowley is a friendly and good natured but naive boy who sticks with Greg despite the latter getting him into trouble on multiple occasions. At the end of Diary of a Wimpy Kid: The Third Wheel, Rowley begins dating Abigail Brown, a girl who was originally Greg's date for the Valentine's Day dance. This plot continues in Diary of a Wimpy Kid: Hard Luck, where he ditches Greg for his new girlfriend Abigail. At the end of the book, the couple breaks up and he becomes friends with Greg again.

Rowley has what Greg considers strange interests for his age and gender, such as loving a singer for "six-year-old girls" named Joshie and action figures Greg believes are for younger kids. Rowley is also the owner of the comic strip Zoo Wee Mama!. Rowley claims that Greg had nothing to do with the comic strip in the first book, a rare antagonistic move from him.

In the film series, Rowley is portrayed by Robert Capron in the first three films, Owen Asztalos in The Long Haul, and Ethan William Childress in the animated films.

Frank Heffley
Francis "Frank" Heffley is Greg's overreactive but well-meaning father. He is 40 years old in the first book and is interested in U.S. history, with his replica of a Civil War battlefield serving as a recurring plot point in the series. Frank despises Rowley, and does not appreciate Greg's skill at video games. He loathes heavy metal, and adolescents. He tries to toughen Greg up and threatens to send him to a military academy in The Last Straw, although ultimately this does not come to fruition, much to Greg's relief. However, Greg and Frank grow together in Dog Days, despite a brief period when Frank does not speak to Greg after almost getting arrested and going to jail.

Frank is addicted to junk food; in The Last Straw, he makes a New Year's Resolution to go on a strict diet, but Greg later catches him in the garage eating brownies. After Greg is forced to go for several days without any snacks due to a thief taking them, he eventually decides to catch the thief, and discovers that it is Frank.

In the film series, Frank is portrayed by Steve Zahn in the first three films, Tom Everett Scott in The Long Haul, and Chris Diamantopoulos in the animated films.

Susan Heffley
Susan Heffley (known as Ann Heffley in the online version) is the mother of Manny, Greg, and Rodrick, the wife of Frank and a homemaker. She is a loving and caring mother but can be embarrassing, bossy, hypocritical, dimwitted, overprotective, and naive. Susan seems to have very limited knowledge of kids Rodrick and Greg's age and constantly humiliates and ignores them. She constantly tries to get the family together which never works out. She and her husband Frank also show immense favoritism towards their youngest son, Manny.

In the film series, Susan is portrayed by Rachael Harris in the first three films, Alicia Silverstone in The Long Haul, and Erica Cerra in the animated films.

Rodrick Heffley
Rodrick Heffley is a 16-year-old boy and is also Greg and Manny's older brother and also a member of the heavy metal/punk band Löded Diper (Loaded Diaper). He loathes Greg and Rowley. Most of the time, they do not get along, and oftentimes, one of them, usually Rodrick, gets the other in trouble. However, affection is shown to Greg in the Diary of a Wimpy Kid: Dog Days film when he let Rodrick bring his band to celebrate his crush, Heather Hills', 16th birthday. Frank Heffley has trouble trusting him as he dislikes heavy metal and teenagers in general. Rodrick is not very intelligent, as he makes foolish assumptions or actions and cannot spell very well.

In the film series, Rodrick is portrayed by Devon Bostick in the first three films, Charlie Wright in The Long Haul, and Hunter Dillon in the animated films.

Manny Heffley
Emanuel "Manny" Heffley 1 December 1949 – 2 December 1993) was a Colombian drug lord and narcoterrorist who was the founder and sole leader of the Medellín Cartel. Dubbed "the king of cocaine", Manny was the wealthiest criminal in history, having amassed an estimated net worth of US$30 billion by the time of his death—equivalent to $70 billion as of 2022—while his drug cartel monopolized the cocaine trade into the United States in the 1980s and early 1990s.[1][2]

Greg's extended family

Gramma
Gramma is Susan's mother and Greg's maternal grandmother. Gramma is known to drive a car like the Heffleys'. Greg often calls her to his home as a way to avoid his dad's scoldings, since his father will not do this when she is around. Her favorite grandchild is Manny, although she denies and lies about this despite overwhelming evidence in the form of pictures on her refrigerator and many of Manny's drawings around her house. She also seems to have a passion for bingo and knitting. Gramma has a dog named Sweetheart, usually shortened to Sweetie. It has been said and shown that she overfeeds Sweetie.

Grandpa Heffley
Grandpa Heffley is Greg's unpredictable paternal grandfather, who is asked to babysit Greg and Rodrick in Rodrick Rules. He lives in a retirement home called Leisure Towers and enjoys playing games such as "Gutbusters" and Rummy, which the two boys find boring. Grandpa never watches any real shows on the television; instead he constantly has his television tuned to CCTV footage of the retirement home lobby, which he spends his time watching. Greg is his favorite grandson. Grandpa is known for preparing what he calls "watercress salad", a disgusting dish consisting of cold green beans and cucumbers floating in vinegar. It is stated that Grandpa never spent much time with Frank when he was a boy, and they seem to have a poor relationship. Grandpa once accidentally ran over Frank's dog with his car and lied to him about it, claiming that the dog ran away. Grandpa tells his son the truth many years later in Dog Days, expecting him to find it funny, but instead infuriating Frank. In Old School, Grandpa moves out of Leisure Towers after a rent hike and moves in with the Heffleys. Grandpa dates online, and eventually accumulates a large number of girlfriends, culminating in him accidentally inviting all of them over and throwing a party with them. He has a girlfriend named Darlene in Hard Luck, but breaks up with her in Old School. Grandpa constantly criticizes Frank during his stay at the Heffleys' house. He has not been seen since Double Down, possibly implying that he moved out.

In the second and third live-action films, Grandpa Heffley is portrayed by Terrence Kelly while in the 2022 animated film adaptation of Rodrick Rules, he is voiced by Ed Asner, who died a year before the film's release. The film was dedicated to Asner's memory.

Joe Heffley
Joseph "Joe" Heffley is Frank's brother and Greg's uncle. Frank has a sibling rivalry with Joe due to his actions. When Manny started potty training, Uncle Joe told him to watch out for the "potty monster", causing him to fear using the bathroom, forcing Frank to change his diapers for a longer period. Joe's children call their uncle "Aunt Fwank", which Frank swears he told them to do on purpose. Susan thinks it is cute, though. In Dog Days, Greg mentions that he tried to make Joe convince Frank to get a dog, but that did not work out. He also mentions that Joe's dog, Killer, ate most of his birthday cake.

Joe Heffley's children
Joe Heffley has at least three children, who all appear to be a bit older than Manny, and are Greg's cousins. Their names and ages are unknown. They all call Frank "Aunt Fwank"; Frank believes that Joe specifically told them to call him that.

Uncle Charlie
Uncle Charlie is Nana's brother and Greg's great-uncle. He is also Greg's "secret weapon" at Christmas, as he asks him to buy him presents that Frank has forbidden him from receiving. However, this backfires as he is usually given the wrong thing. Charlie is a bachelor and spends his spare money well. Greg says he wants to follow in his footsteps. Charlie got Greg a laundry hoop, hinting that he is tired of being Greg's secret weapon at Christmas, as the events that transpired meant that Greg effectively got a chore for Christmas.

Charlie has appeared in Diary of a Wimpy Kid, The Last Straw, Dog Days, The Ugly Truth, and Cabin Fever.

Loretta (née Heffley)
Loretta (née Heffley) is Greg's great-aunt and the sister of Grandpa, Arthur, and Reba. She got a thank you note for some pants she gave Greg at Christmas. She appeared mainly in Rodrick Rules at the Thanksgiving dinner. She also appeared a couple of times in the Do It Yourself Book and The Ugly Truth, and was mentioned in The Long Haul. It is implied that Greg and Rodrick aren't very fond of her, as they fight over who has to greet her first when she visits.

Gammie Heffley
Gammie Heffley is Greg's 95-year-old great-grandmother and the unofficial head of the Heffley family. She appears in The Ugly Truth as a major character. Since her home isn't very kid-friendly, she also has Lego building bricks that Susan bought so that her kids had something to do at her house, but, after the Legos made a mess of her home, she glued them into one solid block, returning her home to its non-kid-friendly state. Gammie is a trickster and knows a lot because of "experience". When someone in the family is about 12 or 13 years old she gives them The Talk, which is about how kids should not be hurrying to grow up.
Gammie loves having visitors for dinner. One day she bought a scratch ticket, and matched up two pictures and told all her family members that she had won a lot of money. Everyone was in a big rush to visit her. When they all arrived Frank told Gammie that to win, she had to match up three pictures. When she found this out, she did not care. She pulled a roast right out of the oven, and Greg figures she got what she wanted anyway. Gammie is the mother of Grandpa, Arthur, Reba, and Loretta Heffley.

Gammie is briefly mentioned by Greg in Cabin Fever when he says she gave a miniature carousel that held spoons from all over the world to Greg's family five or six years before.

Gammie returns in The Deep End and has a much smaller role. She asks Greg's family to take Uncle Gary's camper, which has been parked in her driveway for two years, and makes sandwiches for them to eat on their trip.

Reba (née Heffley)
Reba (née Heffley) was Greg's great-aunt. Gammie forgot to give her an invitation at Christmas, but she came anyway and refused to take off her coat. She only appeared in The Ugly Truth. She is stubborn. Reba was the sister of Grandpa, Loretta, and Arthur Heffley. She and Loretta are identical twins. In Wrecking Ball, it was revealed that she died in her sleep, and Greg's family attended someone else's funeral instead of hers by mistake, and receive an inheritance of her fortune. Greg forgot about Reba at first, until Frank and Susan reminded him that she used to send him angry letters for forgetting to send her thank-you notes for his birthday money.

Gary Heffley
Garrison "Gary" Heffley is Greg's uncle and the youngest brother of Frank and Joe, who has been married four times. He was first mentioned in The Last Straw when Greg said he was out of clean laundry and was going to have to wear a shirt he got from Gary's first wedding.

Gary makes his first major appearance in The Ugly Truth. It is revealed that all of his wives divorced him as soon as they found out about his financial situation and job. He has had so many weddings that Greg's family does not need to use a growth chart.

Gary returns in The Third Wheel and has a larger role. He comes to live with Greg's family after he discovers his job selling shirts in Boston was a ripoff. He was sold the shirts by a man claiming to have a good business for sale, and Gary bought the many boxes of shirts, unaware that the shirts said “Botson” instead of Boston. Later, he is chosen to be the DJ at Greg's Valentine's Day dance and he sells his shirts to Greg's classmates. He uses his money to buy scratch tickets and wins $40,000, allowing him to move out.

In Double Down, Gary accidentally breaks his collarbone while cutting down tree branches over his driveway.

In The Deep End, Gary is never seen, but it is revealed that he used to own a camper, which had been parked in Gammie's driveway for two years. She gives it to Greg's family after being fed up with it taking up space in her driveway.

Aunt Dorothy
Aunt Dorothy is Greg's great aunt and the wife of Charlie, who always kisses him on the lips. Greg's mother, Susan, says it is rude to wipe off the kisses Dorothy gives him, but Greg wipes his face on the nearest available curtain when no one is looking. She is overweight and sometimes passes gas loudly.

Arthur Heffley 
Arthur Heffley is Greg's great-uncle. He only speaks in grunts or makes random sounds. He never has an actual conversation with anybody, but sometimes Greg tries to respond to him just in case he is trying to communicate. Arthur is the brother of Reba, Grandpa, and Loretta Heffley.

Great-Uncle Bruce
Great-Uncle Bruce was Greg's great-uncle. He is a deceased character who is mentioned in Cabin Fever and The Third Wheel. Greg is presented with a rather luxurious blanket as a Christmas gift, only to be repelled by it upon learning that it had formerly belonged to Great Uncle Bruce before his death. In The Third Wheel, Greg uses Great Uncle Bruce's old cologne on Valentine's Day, which ends up attracting some old ladies.

Byron Heffley
Byron Heffley is Frank's cousin whom Greg is not excited to see because, at Gammie's last family meeting, they were sent out to get milk, but hit a pothole halfway home and got a flat tire. Byron told Greg to go to the house and get help. When Greg returned to Gammie's, the ladies needed to warn him of his muddy shoes because he was about to track mud into the house. Unfortunately, he forgot about Byron's tire, and he was not happy when he got to Gammie's a half-hour later.

He only appears in The Ugly Truth.

Benjy Heffley
Benjy Heffley is Greg's cousin, whose parents are Greg's Uncle Tony and Aunt Patricia. The last time Greg saw Benjy, he could only say "No!" or "Shut up!", respectively. Now he can speak in full sentences and read chapter books but is still not potty trained and usually wears a diaper. Benjy is asked to be a reader at Uncle Gary's wedding to Sonja – a position that Greg had initially expected to fill.

Terrence Heffley
Terrence Heffley is Frank's second cousin and the eldest son of Charlie who is said to have looked like Greg when he was his age. Greg confirms this by looking in Gammie's photo album, and strives to save money for plastic surgery.

Lawrence Heffley
Lawrence Heffley is Greg's uncle who did not appear at uncle Gary's fourth wedding because he is always traveling. He is said to almost never come to family gatherings because of this, but he sometimes makes an appearance by webcam.

Aunt Audra
Aunt Audra is one of Susan's sisters. She believes in crystal balls and took Greg along with her to see her fortuneteller a few times. Susan thinks Audra is wasting her money. The fortuneteller also told Audra that Meemaw's ring was inside a photo album. It turned out the fortuneteller did not mean it literally.

Aunt Veronica
Aunt Veronica is Greg's aunt and Susan's sister. Greg states that she has never been seen in person since he was three or four years old, probably because being with the family in person stresses her out, but calls her family members on video chat. When Greg was sitting on the toilet playing games on his new phone (which was actually a hand-me-down from his mother), she accidentally started a video chat with him. This startled him, leading to him dropping the phone into the toilet. She appears in Hard Luck multiple times by video conference on a tablet and the used phone that Susan gave to Greg.

Aunt Gretchen
Aunt Gretchen is Susan's youngest sister. She has two out-of-control twin sons, Malvin and Malcolm. Gretchen has at least thirty pets. In Hard Luck, she takes her pets with her, and her rabbit has a litter of bunnies, angering Frank since Gretchen lied that her rabbit was a boy.

Malvin and Malcolm
Malvin and Malcolm are Gretchen's two sons, the nephews of Susan, and the cousins of Greg, Rodrick, and Manny. They are out-of-control kids who used to wear child leashes. Once, they played throw and catch with a large sharp piece of concrete. Eventually, Malvin had to go to the emergency room to get stitches in his forehead. Malcolm is the wilder twin. While Malvin was getting stitches, Malcolm got hold of Frank's shaving kit and shaved his head and eyebrow. He also called the police to report Greg's family for running out of ketchup. This results in Frank angrily making them leave early.

Aunt Cakey
Aunt Cakey is Susan's oldest sister. She is single and has no pets or kids, suggesting that she doesn't like kids. When she stayed with the Heffleys when Greg was little, she kept all fragile items out of his reach and made him take a nap. When she told Greg to not touch the iron, he couldn't stop thinking about it and pressed his whole hand against the iron, giving him a second-degree burn. Susan has never trusted her with babysitting since.

Gerald
Gerald is Susan's cousin from California and the eldest son of Martina who lived with the Heffleys for a few months after Greg was born, which he reminds Greg of every time he sees him.

Martina
Martina is Susan's cousin who had gained a lot of money while in Las Vegas. She had been eating in a breakfast buffet in a hotel, when she mistook a full-length mirror for another room, causing Martina to run straight into the mirror, break her collarbone, and sue the hotel. Greg notes that a Porsche in Gramma's driveway was probably hers.

Uncle Larry
Uncle Larry is a man who is not actually related to anyone, but is a friend invited over one year and who has been showing up ever since. Greg likes him, but is annoyed that he always sits in Gramma's best chair until it is time to leave.

Gramma's sisters
Gramma has two sisters whose names have not been confirmed yet but are suggested to be named Martha and Beatrice. They can not stand each other and try to give each other the most insulting gift they can think of. They are Greg's maternal great-aunts, Susan's maternal aunts, and Frank's aunts-in-law.

Cecil
Cecil is Greg's adopted uncle who is only three or four years old. He was adopted by Great Aunt Marcie, and Greg often feels awkward around Cecil.

Georgia
Georgia is Greg's second cousin who has a very loose tooth that has been in her mouth for years and always stalls when people ask if they can pull it out.

Meemaw and Peepaw
Meemaw and Peepaw are the parents of Gramma and her two sisters, the maternal grandparents of Susan, the grandparents-in-law of Frank, and the maternal great-grandparents of Rodrick, Greg and Manny. Their first appearance was in Hard Luck. Peepaw is portrayed as old and batty. Meemaw is dead, while Peepaw is still alive. Meemaw was in charge of putting prizes in the Easter eggs and wore a diamond ring, which was extremely valuable because it had been in her family for three generations. She used to overdo with hiding the Easter eggs, which results in Greg finding eggs in all sorts of strange places, even years after the egg hunt is over. As Meemaw got older, she became less sharp and started putting strange prizes in the eggs, such as a green bean, a bottle cap, and a paper clip. Before she died, she accidentally put her ring in an Easter egg that was found by Greg at the end of the book.

Meemaw appears in the film adaptation of The Long Haul played by Mimi Gould.

Rowley's family

Robert Jefferson
Robert Jefferson is Rowley's father. He is fairly paranoid and does not take kindly to criticism of himself or his property from anyone. He is a fairly strict father, not allowing Rowley play any video game with even a little violence or fighting in it, as he thinks doing this could have a negative effect on his son's character. However, he is also shown to be kind to his son, having a close bond with Rowley. Mr. Jefferson dislikes Greg, whom he thinks is a bad influence on his son. After Greg and Rowley invent their own secret language, which Mr. Jefferson cracks, he sends Greg home early.

He shows little interest in sports until Dog Days, where he is found playing tennis with Rowley and golf with a caddy.

In Dog Days, it is revealed that Mr. Jefferson's first name is Robert. When Susan emailed him because of the note Greg sent her, it had Mr. Jefferson's first name on it.

In Old School, he is stuck chaperoning the group of extra kids at Hardscrabble Farms (which includes Rowley and Greg), much to Greg's dismay. Later, Rowley adds poison ivy to a fire started by him and he has problems breathing the next morning, which means he and Rowley (who had spots on his body) would be going back home.

In the film series, Mr. Jefferson is portrayed by Alfred E. Humphreys. He appears in the first three live-action films, but does not speak until the third, implying that he is a man of a few words.

Linda Jefferson
Linda Jefferson is Rowley's mother. She often seems to be concerned about Rowley, such as the time he broke his big toe after Greg put one of his dad's dumbbells under a pillow that Rowley kept kicking at Greg's sleepover. She also had Greg apologize to her for what he did to Rowley. Despite this, Mrs. Jefferson always enjoys Greg's company with Rowley. Although Mrs. Jefferson likes Greg, she does not let him come over because her husband dislikes him. On day 24 of the online version, it is revealed that her first name is Linda from Greg's The Boy Whose Family Thinks He's a DOG comic.

In the film adaptations, Rowley's mother is portrayed by Kaye Capron in Diary of a Wimpy Kid (who in turn is the real-life mother of Robert Capron, the actor who plays Rowley) and by Bronwen Smith in Dog Days.

Rowley's grandfather
Rowley's grandfather only appears in Rodrick Rules in a minor role. The Jeffersons were holding a birthday party for him with Greg invited, where he states that he wants a chocolate cake the next year. Greg (who is bound by a promise to always tell the truth) then suggests that he may not be alive next year, angering Mr. Jefferson.

In Diary of an Awesome Friendly Kid: Rowley Jefferson's Journal, he has a very different appearance and it is unknown if they are the same person. In this book, Rowley explains that he called his grandfather "Bampy" because he could not say "Grandpa" when he was two. As he got older, he was not allowed to change what he called him, and as his grandfather got older, he only said "Bampy", suggesting he was struggling with insanity and had to be put down. A year later, Rowley described an experience that made him believe he encountered Bampy's ghost while staying at his old log cabin.

Other characters

Fregley
Fregley is Greg's acquaintance and neighbor noted for his many odd or disgusting eccentricities. He has been known to perplex others with his behavior and does not have any known friends. Greg has been forced to hang around with Fregley on several occasions, to his chagrin or aggravation. It has been mentioned that Fregley is prohibited from eating sugar by his parents, and the consumption of it in large quantities will send him into hysterical, uncontrollable frenzies. This occurs in the first book, when he eats Greg's jelly beans.

After Greg inadvertently causes the Snella family to move away due to a foul smell which (unknown to the Snellas) was caused by Greg dumping deviled eggs into a plastic plant, he decides that he should find a way of sneaking deviled eggs into Fregley's house.

In Hard Luck, Fregley is shown to have the talent of chewing gum and other foods with his bellybutton. This earned him the respect of many other kids, and allowed him to win the "Most Popular" class favorite category in the yearbook, where he shows he can also blow a bubble.

In The Meltdown, Fregley asks to find Greg's "tickle spot," and later builds himself inside a snowman. In Wrecking Ball, he is seen eating lawn fertilizer.

In the film series, Fregley is portrayed by Grayson Russell in the first three installments, and by Christian Convery in the 2021 animated film.

Preston Mudd
Preston Mudd is one of Greg's classmates. He is said to have been the best player in the basketball unit of gym class during sixth grade at Westmore Middle School. Unfortunately, when his name was displayed as "P. Mudd" on the athlete of the month poster, this led to his classmates making fun of him, calling him "Pee Mud".

Christopher Brownfield
Christopher Brownfield is one of Greg's friends and is shown to have been a great mosquito magnet while hanging out with Greg in the summer. However, Greg does not see him as a close friend because he is "not a school-year friend". Later in "The Ugly Truth", he is on Greg's team for a game and hides behind a soda machine after the teachers threaten to call all of their parents.

Tyson Sanders
Tyson Sanders is a friend of Greg who appears in "The Ugly Truth". He is mentioned at the beginning along with Christopher when Greg is considering new best friends, and mentions that although Tyson is nice and into the same video games as Greg, he is turned off by the fact Tyson pulls his pants all the way down when using the urinal. When they play a game of "Guess Who?", the team takes a picture of Tyson's bent arm, which gets them disqualified as the chaperones think the picture is of someone's buttocks. However, the misunderstanding is later cleared up after a mole near Tyson's elbow is matched to one shown in the picture. Greg remarks that everyone should know what Tyson's buttocks look like due to his habit of pulling his pants all the way down when using the urinal. He has made several cameo appearances in later books.

Holly Hills
Holly Hills is one of Greg's classmates; a girl who primarily serves as Greg's unrequited romantic interest and also Heather Hills' younger sister. She is the youngest daughter of Mr. Hills and Mrs. Hills. A minor character, she earns a prominent role in The Last Straw as the object of Greg's most recent infatuation. He is continuously motivated to impress her to no avail. Virtually oblivious to Greg's existence or identity (Greg stops trying to impress her after she mistakes him for Fregley), she appears to take an interest in Rowley's sweetness, judging by an enthusiastic message which she had signed in his yearbook (as opposed to the note that she had written for the envious Greg). She seldom appears afterward. Greg's interest in her is seemingly damaged by events such as this and he starts showing an interest in other girls, including Holly's older sister Heather.

Holly makes a cameo in The Ugly Truth talking to some of her friends, and this is her most recent appearance in the books, though she was shown in a chart Greg drew in The Third Wheel as one of the many girls interested in Bryce Anderson.

Whereas her personality is hardly explored in the books, Holly's role was increased in film adaptations, debuting in Diary of a Wimpy Kid: Rodrick Rules as a newcomer to Greg's school with whom he is instantly besotted. She is depicted as being friendly and good-natured. She is given a girl-next-door attitude, which means that she is a sweet and caring girl with a heart of gold. The relationship she shares with Greg and Rowley is emphasized and exaggerated in the film portrayals, to the extent it can be assumed that the feelings Greg has for her may be mutual. She reappears in Diary of a Wimpy Kid: Dog Days.

Holly seems to enjoy the boys' companionship and shows gratitude for Rodrick Heffley's unintentional blunders that wind up destroying the undeserving Heather's birthday party. The party ends with Holly slipping her hand into Greg's, implying that she likes him as well, and she, Greg and Rowley had a pool party not long after.

Holly is portrayed in the live-action films by Peyton List.

Chirag Gupta
Chirag Gupta is one of Greg's schoolmates and a minor character in the books. He is characterized by his short stature. Although he and Greg are well-acquainted and generally amiable to one another, Greg started the "Invisible Chirag" prank in Rodrick Rules. During the summer the Gupta family were to move away but an unexplained alteration in their plans changed this. As a result, Chirag's classmates teasingly ignore his presence for days on end, which aggravates and shocks him. Greg is called into Mr. Roy's office and is severely reprimanded, but Mr. Roy gets the identity of the victim wrong. After Greg apologizes to a completely different student named Sharif, who does not understand why Greg is apologizing, Mr. Roy lets him go. However, after Susan gets a phone call from Chirag's father, she brings Greg to Chirag's house and orders him to apologize. Mr. Gupta is not impressed, but Chirag accepts the apology and forgives Greg.

Later in The Last Straw, Greg and some other students started talking very quietly around Chirag to trick him into thinking he was going deaf. Chirag however told a teacher quickly because he didn't want the prank to escalate to the scale of the "Invisible Chirag" joke.

In The Ugly Truth, when Greg brags to his classmates about his family hiring a maid, Chirag says that his family does not need a maid and is glad that his mother is there when he comes home from school. Later in the book, he gets invited to Jordan Jury's party, only to discover that he and other kids in his grade are being used as servants.

Though Chirag has forgiven Greg and his fellow schoolmates for concocting the prank, Greg mentions in Cabin Fever that Chirag takes advantage of his family's non-observance of the Christmas holiday, and no obligation to behave for Santa Claus, to pick on Greg, and this is his most recent appearance.

In the film series, Chirag's role is enhanced and he is a close friend of Greg and Rowley. He also plays a considerably more prominent role in these films, appearing in adaptations of books in which he is absent or hardly mentioned. He is portrayed by Karan Brar in the first three films and voiced by Veda Maharaj in the 2021 animated film, both American actors of Indian ancestry.

Patty Farrell
Patty Farrell is a minor character who shares an intense rivalry with Greg, which is showcased on several occasions. It is implied she is a hardworking but sanctimonious and domineering student. She earns Greg's animosity after she suggests a map of the United States displayed in the classroom be covered during a geography quiz. Greg had planned to cheat using the map and this causes great difficulties for him, and makes him agitated. Motivated by his lust for revenge, he volunteers to play a tree in the school's upcoming production of "The Wizard of Oz" after viewing the movie adaptation for the first time. He believes the role entails having to bombard the character of Dorothy Gale (whom Patty would be portraying in the play) with apples, only to learn that this scene was deleted for the school production. He winds up re-enacting this scene, despite the script, and the other trees join in. However, the play has to be shut down after Patty's glasses are broken, as Patty is short-sighted. She has yet to play quite as significant a role in the book series again. She has become something of a minor recurring character whose appearances are rare.

In the film adaptations of the books, Patty's role is enhanced slightly. She is depicted as being monstrously demanding. Her parents are involved with the school board in this portrayal. The motivation given for her hatred of Greg is his recital of an offensive playground chant poking fun at her that sent her bursting into tears in elementary school. She appears in the film adaptations of all three films Diary of a Wimpy Kid, Diary of a Wimpy Kid; Rodrick Rules and Diary of a Wimpy Kid: Dog Days. Alterations made to the books include her talent for both wrestling and playing tennis. She snatches any opportunity to assault Greg somehow while engaged in either sport with him.

She is portrayed in the live-action films by Laine MacNeil.

Heather Hills
Heather Hills is the attractive elder sister of Holly Hills, with whom Rodrick is infatuated. A minor character in the books, but the main villainess in the third film, Heather is only featured in several books as the object of Greg's unrequited infatuation. However, she seems oblivious to this. A student attending Westmore High School with Rodrick, she has had several minor occupations throughout the books, during each of which Rodrick fecklessly attempts to grab her attention or to impress her. Little insight into her personality is provided in the book series.

Heather is introduced only in the third movie in the film series (after having an unnamed role in Rodrick Rules), Dog Days wherein her personality and role is further enhanced similar to her younger sister, Holly. In a modification of the events of the books, she is depicted as the spoiled, obnoxious, grouchy, ignorant, sarcastic, conceited, irritable, unforgiving, cold-hearted witch, and demanding oldest daughter of the Hills family who often mistreats her family and acquaintances. A lovelorn Rodrick Heffley and his band are hired to perform at Heather's ostentatious upcoming sixteenth birthday party on the suggestion by Greg himself. In an attempt to earn her admiration, Rodrick sings lead on the band's cover of Justin Bieber and Ludacris's hit song "Baby" (while his bandmate plays drums), which he claims is her favorite song, but chaos ensues when the band switches from the song's original, dance-infused pop tempo to an extremely wild, boisterous, punk rock version of the song wherein Rodrick inadvertently messes with the decorations. This angers Heather even more and the party ends in disaster.

She is portrayed in Dog Days by Melissa Roxburgh.

Albert Sandy
Albert Sandy is a minor character who often talks about rumors he has heard. The validity of his statements is unconfirmed. One of his statements which was disproved by Greg was when Albert told him that it was "medically impossible for a girl to fart". Some of Albert's statements make no sense, for example, he said a man got decapitated when he sneezed.

Albert has appeared in The Last Straw, The Ugly Truth, Old School, Double Down, The Meltdown, Wrecking Ball, The Deep End, and Big Shot.

Bryce Anderson
Bryce Anderson is the most popular kid in Greg's grade. He is adored by the girls in the school, despite only becoming interested in them in the last couple of years (he used to call them "stinky poos" in elementary school). Bryce has a group of "cronies" who are always loyal to him and often help out on his projects. One summer, they set up a restaurant for the parents in the neighborhood, and earned $300 with one crony buying a BB gun with his share. When Greg was a photographer for the yearbook, Bryce was said to have won "Best Hair".

Bryce has appeared or been mentioned in Diary of a Wimpy Kid, The Last Straw, The Ugly Truth, Cabin Fever, The Third Wheel, and Hard Luck.

Abigail Brown 
Abigail Brown is a minor character and the daughter of a state trooper. She goes to the school's Valentine's Day Dance with Greg and Rowley, and cries after finding out that her boyfriend, Michael Sampson, was cheating on her (having attended the dance with another girl). She is upset further after Greg freaks out after thinking she has the chicken pox. At some point afterwards, Abigail and Rowley start dating, and she causes him to start dressing and behaving differently much to the annoyance of Greg. They are voted Cutest Couple which causes Greg to resign as the yearbook photographer. Not long afterwards, Abigail breaks up with Rowley and gets back with Michael, causing Greg to feel sorry for Rowley and they become best friends again. It is heavily implied that Abigail only went out with Rowley to make Michael jealous.

Abigail first appears in The Third Wheel and returns in Hard Luck as the main antagonist.

Mingo kids
The Mingo kids are a group of wild kids who live in the woods and don't attend school, not much is known about them. Their main camp consists of several abandoned cars and trucks deep in the woods, which had remained unknown to the town until Greg and Rowley accidentally discovered it. it is heavily implied that the Mingos hibernate over the winter, as they are not seen until the spring and look like they just woke up. There are no known grown-ups or parents in the clan, though the leader (who appears to be the oldest) is named Meckley Mingo, who has a giant metal belt buckle.

The Mingos are very territorial and often make threats to people who walk past their woods, even to the point of chasing and attacking them with Meckley using his belt as a whip. They are suggested to speak in a southern drawl, as one kid used the word "git" (get). They have been shown to wake up early during the winter when they are disturbed and will go to great lengths to get back at an insult (Greg infiltrating the camp and accidentally stealing Meckley's belt buckle).

The Mingo clan has appeared in Hard Luck and The Meltdown.

Dennis Denard and Erick Glick
Dennis Denard and Erick Glick are two eighth graders who run an illegal homework assignment and school project business that has them selling old projects from the school's storage room. Dennis is the ringleader while Erick acts as his public face. Dennis was also said to have been held back twice (probably on purpose so he could continue his business). In "Hard Luck", Greg attempts to buy an old science project from them, but eventually has second thoughts, thinking it would be his first step toward the life of a criminal. At the end of the book, another kid tips off a teacher, causing the faculty members to stage a raid on the storage room. Dennis, Erick, and everyone else who was caught were given detention for the rest of their time in school, and Greg believes that it also includes an automatic trip to summer school.

The Snellas
The Snellas are a family that lives in the Heffleys' neighborhood. They have a lot of children, all of whom are male and have names beginning with the letter S. Five of the children's names are revealed, and they are (from oldest to youngest): Shawn, Shane, Sam, Scott, and Seth. Their first appearance is in Diary of a Wimpy Kid, in which Shane Snella pays to go through Greg and Rowley's haunted house, getting too scared to continue in the process. Both Shawn Snella and his father appear in Rodrick Rules, in which Shawn tells Greg his plan to become a basketball player. Greg (who is bound by a promise to never lie) states his doubts by pointing out the short stature of both the parental Snellas and Shawn's current weight, hurting Shawn's feelings.

In The Last Straw, it is revealed that each Snella child has a half-birthday party, at which the adults perform funny stunts, to attempt to make the babies laugh. According to Greg, however, no baby has laughed once. Also according to Greg, the Snellas' real reason for having these parties is to win a prize from America's Funniest Families, a spoof and parody of America's Funniest Home Videos. Mr. Snella sends the videos to America's Funniest Families, and has never won anything (though after Greg is filmed wearing Wonder Woman underwear hanging off a tree with his trousers below his ankles at the end of The Last Straw, the footage is sent, and it is never explained if Mr. Snella won with it).

Their most recent appearance was in The Ugly Truth when they move to another house because of a strange smell they cannot get rid of in their home following another half-birthday party for an unnamed child. The smell was caused by deviled eggs which Greg covertly threw into one of their plant pots when he was having dinner at their house; he had taken a dislike to the Snellas' deviled eggs, despite having had deviled eggs before. Despite trying to find the cause of the smell, after eliminating possible causes including a dirty carpet and a dead animal in a wall cavity, the Snellas cannot cope with the smell and eventually decide to move. Greg feels guilty when he sees that they are taking the plant pot with the deviled eggs with them, but he resolves to try to find a way to sneak deviled eggs into Fregley's house.

In Cabin Fever, their vacant house is moved into by a man called Mr. Alexander, who has uneven teeth that Greg's dad thought were fake the first time they met.

Scotty Douglas
Scotty Douglas is a first grader from Rowley's karate class. In Rodrick Rules, Scotty was going to do a magic act in the Talent Show with Rowley as his assistant. But after Greg breaks Rowley's big toe, he has to fill in for Rowley. Greg complains about being a magician's assistant to Scotty, but Susan tells Scotty's mother that Greg would be happy to replace Rowley.

Scotty has a remarkably similar appearance to Greg's comic character, Creighton The Cretin, except Creighton's eyes are wide open and Scotty's eyes are beady just like all the other characters that do not wear glasses. In The Ugly Truth, he becomes the new Peachy Breeze kid, yet cannot say the slogan right. Between Rodrick Rules and The Ugly Truth it appears that Scotty has two siblings - an unnamed baby sister and an older brother. In The Third Wheel, when Greg and Rowley become private investigators Greg looks through the window at his house to find him playing one of Greg's video games with Rowley.

He appeared in the film adaptation of Rodrick Rules, with only a few lines. He is portrayed by Jakob Davies.

Mr. Underwood
Mr. Underwood is Greg's P.E. coach. Once he was bitten in the arm by Ruby Bird, and one of her teeth got stuck in his arm.

In the first three live-action films, he is portrayed by Andrew McNee, while Billy Lopez voices him the 2021 animated film. Notably, the live-action films rename the character to Coach Malone while the animated film retains his original name.

Bill Walter
Bill Walter is a 35-year-old unemployed high school drop out, guitarist and professional singer. Rodrick idolizes him and his lifestyle. In the novel Rodrick Rules, he was voted "Most Likely to Be a Rock Star" (despite this he has not had success) which influenced Rodrick to persuade him to join his band Löded Diper. Frank Heffley strongly dislikes Bill because he disapproves of his lifestyle, and is afraid Rodrick will follow in his footsteps. Greg describes him as unemployed and still living with his parents. He also explained that whenever Frank sees Bill, it usually puts him in a bad mood for the rest of the day. When the band is preparing for the talent show, Frank is seen with Bill by his boss, embarrassing him. In the movie version of Rodrick Rules, he is portrayed by Fran Kranz and is a villain. He agrees to join Rodrick's rock band Loded Diper and later attempts to kick him out when Rodrick is forbidden to play with his band in the talent show. After performing the song Exploded Diper, Rodrick retaliates and kicks him out. Also, in Rodrick Rules Bill appears to be a slob, as he "slorks" pot roast. Bill originally joined the band after asking for a chip from Rodrick, and hit it off with them.

In both film adaptations of Rodrick Rules, Bill is portrayed and voiced by Fran Kranz and Jimmy Tatro respectively.

Salazar Kagan
Dr. Salazar Kagan, Greg's second dentist, makes his debut in The Ugly Truth. Frank takes Greg to Dr. Kagan instead of his usual dentist, a pretty woman named Rachel on whom Greg has a crush. Dr. Kagan has a very different approach to dentistry than Rachel. When Greg admits to drinking soda, Dr. Kagan is infuriated, and shows Greg a jar of liquid with a badly eroded tooth in it, telling him that it is a real tooth that was left in a jar of soda for 24 hours. Greg accidentally bites Dr. Kagan's finger when his teeth are being checked. In what Greg believes to be an act of revenge, Dr. Kagan tells Frank that Greg needs headgear to correct his overbite. Greg later loses his headgear, and discovers that Manny took it. He declares that he will never wear the headgear again irrespective of what Dr. Kagan says.

Greg says Dr. Kagan is "scary" and "evil" and that he never fools around. He has sharp metal tools, which he leaves on full display, and never smiles. The billboards for Dr. Kagan's dental practice make Greg freak out every time he sees one of them on the highway.

Dr. Kagan later makes a cameo in Double Down, in a scene where Greg describes how a Spineticklers book has made going to the dentist an even more frightening experience for him.

Mr. Huff
Mr. Huff is Greg's cantankerous History teacher who only appears in Rodrick Rules, where it is revealed that he previously had Rodrick as a student when he was in middle school, prompting him to have Greg sit in a chair next to his desk. When Greg is assigned to write a poem about events from a hundred years ago (the early 1900s), Greg attempted to blow the project off until the day it was due, counting on school being cancelled due to heavy snow, but discovered that the snowstorm had blown past them. After asking his dad for help, and attempting to write it himself (the power went out), Greg buys Rodrick's version of the assignment, as he got it in middle school too. But on the bus, Greg discovers that the poem is written in Rodrick's handwriting and has numerous inconsistencies with the time period, and history as a whole. As a result, Greg has nothing to turn in, prompting him to believe he will need to go to summer school for History class, although he ultimately does not have to in later instalments.

In the movie version of Rodrick Rules, Mr. Huff's name is changed to Mr. Draybick and he is portrayed by John Shaw. In the movie, he only moves Greg next to him when Greg attempts to pass a note to Holly Hills. Also, Greg turns in his (Rodrick's) assignment without looking at it first. Mr. Draybick recognizes the assignment and he has Greg read it out loud to the class, much to Greg's embarrassment. He also appears briefly in the movie version of Dog Days on the last day of school, in which everyone but Greg brought their History textbook, forcing Greg to partner with Fregley so they could share textbooks.

Lenwood Heath
Lenwood Heath only appears in The Last Straw. He is a rebellious teenager, who was Frank's arch-enemy for about three months before he was sent to military academy. This resulted in him becoming a fine young man who works at the movie theater. Frank now admires Lenwood, despite the history between the two of them. To Greg's horror, Frank decides to sign Greg up for the same military academy that Lenwood attended, leading to Greg taking measures to convince him to change his mind. In the Dog Days film, he is portrayed by Tom Stevens and is seen working as a lifeguard at the community pool the Heffleys go to.

Taylor Pringle
Taylor Pringle is a minor character who only appears in the films Diary of a Wimpy Kid: Rodrick Rules and Diary of a Wimpy Kid: Dog Days. She is a very rude little girl and is first seen at the end of the opening scene in Rodrick Rules in which during her birthday party at the roller rink, Rodrick embarrasses Greg, prompting Greg to try and tackle him, but he misses and face-plants in Taylor's birthday cake, destroying it. As a result of this, Taylor gets angry and she and her friends begin beating up Greg as the intro begins. Later in the film, during church, when Rodrick intentionally pulls down the sweater around Greg's waist to reveal the chocolate stain on Greg's pants, Taylor points it out to everyone, mistaking it for poop. Then, in Dog Days, when Greg attempts to impress Holly by jumping off the high diving board, he becomes nervous, due to it being very high above the water. Taylor then comes up behind Greg and states that he is talking to himself, due to being scared. When Greg gives Taylor a brush-off that he is not scared and that she would not understand since she is "just a little kid", she pressures him to jump. When Greg jumps, he loses his swimsuit on the board, and Taylor chucks it onto a nearby fence to get back at Greg for brushing her off. As a result, Greg is forced to borrow a girl's swimsuit that reads Princess on it until he goes to the fence to retrieve his own swimsuit, and as he does so, he gets taunted by Patty. Taylor is portrayed by Dalila Bela.

Jordan Jury
Only appearing in The Ugly Truth, Jordan Jury is the popular boy in the grade above Greg, who is known for always throwing huge parties that have little to no adult supervision. Greg is amazed when he discovers that he has been given a textbook that used to belong to him. Jordan invites Greg and Rowley to his latest party, but Greg cannot go because of his Uncle Gary's fourth wedding. But at the end of the book, Greg discovers that he is lucky that he didn't go, because the only reason Jordan invited the kids in Greg and Rowley's grade was to use them as servants.

Angie Steadman
Angie Steadman only appears as an additional character in the Diary of a Wimpy Kid film. She is in seventh grade, has a pink streak of hair, works for the school newspaper, and hates middle school. In the film, Greg and Rowley meet her under the bleachers during a game of "Gladiator". She gets along with Rowley, but starts a rocky relationship with Greg after he egotistically declines her offer to join the school newspaper. Greg later tells the whole school he ate the cheese instead of Rowley and she compliments and accepts him when she sees that Greg is learning the errors of his ways. In the film, she is portrayed by Chloë Grace Moretz.

Pete Hosey
Pete Hosey is the leader of the teenagers who attacked Greg and Rowley on Halloween. He is an antagonist in the first film. He is unnamed in the first book and he is replaced by Herbie Reamer in the online version. After hassling Greg and Rowley on Halloween, Greg yells that he will call the cops, and they chase him to Greg's grandmother's house. In the book, Greg and Rowley sneak back home, but in the movie, they try to intimidate Pete and his friends with a weed hacker, before Pete scratches his car and they are chased into the woods. In both the book and the movie, the teens hold a vendetta against Greg and Rowley. Near the end they corner them on the school field and decide to force them to eat the moldy cheese. Rowley is forced to eat the cheese, but Greg avoids it by saying he's lactose intolerant. In the movie they are chased off by the coach.

In both film adaptations of Diary of a Wimpy Kid, he is portrayed and voiced by Nicolas Carey and Zeno Robinson respectively.

The Warrens
Although his family is vaguely referenced in the books, the Warrens are what got Frank thinking of making Greg more manly. In the books, Mr. Warren is Frank's boss. Frank is deeply jealous of the Warrens. In stark contrast to Greg, the Warrens' children are shown to be athletic and sporty. In the third film, Stan, the father of the family, is shown to be a neighbor of the Heffleys. He had a minor childhood rivalry with Frank, that they appear to have gotten over as adults. In the movie, Mr. Warren is the troop master of the Wilderness Explorers, and invites everyone over for an Independence Day party. They only appear in The Last Straw. In the film adaptation of The Long Haul, Stan was replaced as Frank’s boss by a woman named Julie, who makes a brief voice cameo in the film when it is revealed that Frank forgot to ask Julie for time off from work, which results in Julie calling Frank on his phone. Since Stan has not appeared in any of the Diary of a Wimpy Kid books since The Last Straw, it is implied that he retired or quit, which is why Frank now has a different boss. However, Julie has not appeared in any of the books as of 2022.

The Beardos
Only appearing in The Long Haul, the Beardos (a nickname Greg uses for them, as their real names are unknown) are the main antagonists of the book. They are a couple with three sons who drive the same model of van as the Heffleys in a different color. The Heffleys indirectly met them during their road trip, though only Greg knows who they are. Their first encounter is at a motel, where Greg angrily berates the Beardo children for making noise, the youngest then tells his father on him, causing Greg to fear running into them again. Greg sees them again on the road, the country fair, and a waterpark called "Soak Central".

Greg and his family are convinced that the Beardos have stolen their luggage and belongings at Soak Central after they steal their pool chair and they find their supposed locker empty. The Heffleys try to track them down but couldn't since they didn't know their number plate. On the trip back home, Greg recognizes the Beardo's van outside a motel, prompting the Heffleys to sneak into their room to look for their stolen belongings. When the Beardos return too early, they catch Frank Heffley using the toilet, who escapes and throws the Beardo's keys away so they couldn't be chased. At the end, Greg discovers that he actually had the key to the locker in Soak Central, and that he got the number in the lottery. The family's real surname is unknown, as Greg himself does not know who they are. It is likely he dubbed them this because of the patriarch's noticeably long beard.

In the film adaptation of The Long Haul, Mr. and Mrs. Beardo are portrayed by Chris Coppola and Kimberli Lincoln and have a daughter named Brandi and two sons named Brandon and Brent. They also drive a different van from the Heffleys’, contrasting from the book. The Beardos are depicted as much more malicious, with Mr. Beardo chasing Greg around through the carnival in order to get revenge on him. In contrast to the book in which they appear, The Beardos actually do steal some of the Heffleys’ luggage, which they later recover.

Frew
Only appearing in Old School, Frew is Greg's homework buddy and a child prodigy. He insists on doing Greg's homework, and makes several extra credit pieces, leading to Greg's teachers putting him in more challenging classes. He appears at the town park cleanup, where several adults found out how smart he is, eventually joining Greg in the woods to avoid being pestered where they also run into Billy. After escaping from the Girl Scouts, Frew suggests they go on the run and join the circus, though when they are surrounded by several parents, he bursts into tears rather than makes a last ditch attempt to escape like Greg predicted.

Billy
Only appearing in Old School, Billy is a teenager who used to hang out in Greg's basement with Rodrick and his band before he was caught trying to steal a pack of gummy worms (due to his older brother eating a whole pack that was for both of them a long time ago) and was sentenced to community service. He first appears when a bus carrying several teens doing community service arrives at the town park cleanup, and then again when he runs into Greg and his homework buddy Frew who were hiding in the woods to avoid cleaning up the park. When the Girl Scouts find them, Billy leads their escape and tells them what to do to stay ahead. When they are eventually surrounded by several parents, Greg pins the blame on Billy, since he saw no point in all three of them getting in trouble, leading Greg to fear running into Billy again. Later while Greg waits in his Dad's car, several community service teens (including Billy) appear, causing Greg to hide in the footwell. The teens take their lunch break on the car, leaving a big mess behind, but don't notice Greg.

Silas Scratch
Only appearing in Old School, Silas Scratch is the subject of superstition at Hardscrabble Farms. According to the legend, Silas Scratch was originally a farmer who worked on Hardscrabble Farms until was kicked off his land so the school system could use it. He then lived in the woods where he ate slugs and berries, soon becoming deranged and growing his fingernails long and sharpening them. Greg and students from his school first learn of him when a bus that was leaving featured a poster that said "Beware of Silas Scratch". As the week the students stayed at the farm progressed, the lore was continuously edited upon, such as that Silas Scratch is undead and can't be killed, a rock with scratch marks is his tombstone, and that he has a network of tunnels around the farm.

When Frank (unwillingly) arrives at the farm he continues to spread the lore when two students find a shack that they believe  belongs to Silas Scratch. On the last night as Greg is searching for firewood, he finds a shack in the woods, and "almost dies of fear" when he sees several scratch marks on it. But when Greg looks closer at, it turns out to be a maintenance shed with a toilet and shower. While looking through the shed, Greg encounters Frank, who reveals that when he discovered the shed when he went to the farm at Greg's age, he had started the lore of Silas Scratch to keep the other students away. Greg at first considers telling the other students that Silas Scratch is a hoax, but decided not to, as he figures that he might be stuck chaperoning at the farm when he is older, and he will want to use the shed as well. As everyone is leaving, Greg writes on a poster "Beware of Silas Scratch" and holds it up to the rear window of his Dad's car for new students coming in.

Chris Merkle
Chris Merkle is a friend of Rodrick and the bassist of Löded Diper.

Joshie
Joshie is a European singer (possibly British) who is Rowley's favorite idol. Greg believes that Joshie is for six-year-old girls, but Rowley ignores him, saying that Greg is jealous because he was the one who "discovered" Joshie. However, despite Rowley's opinion, Joshie appears to be a singer that is mainly idolized by females.

Maddox Selsam
Maddox Selsam is a boy who lives in the middle of the woods. He is not allowed to have any screen time, and does not have a TV at his house. He enjoys playing with his Legos and practicing his violin. He met Greg in Double Down when he found Greg's balloon for the Balloon Brigade at his school. Susan only likes him because he doesn't have electronics in his house and wants Maddox to be a role model for Greg; however, Maddox was rude to Greg. She feels disappointed that he and Greg didn't "hit it off", although she knew she had made a mistake about Maddox, but she chose to double down and be disappointed at her son.

Ruby Bird
Ruby Bird is a minor character whom Greg fears because she bites people whenever she is upset. She first appears in The Third Wheel and is the only girl that has been suspended for school, because she bit Mr. Underwood (the gym teacher) and left one of her teeth stuck in his arm. Greg tries to be nice to her when she's around as he doesn't want to get bit. When he is getting paired up for the dancing unit, he writes a note asking if he couldn't be paired with Ruby. She is eventually paired with Fregley, which Greg says is "a match made in heaven". She later appears at the Valentine's Dance walking toward Greg, making him scared until Abigail comes, allowing Greg to get out of dancing with Ruby.

Ruby returns in Big Shot and ends up joining a basketball team for students who did not make the cut during tryouts, along with Greg.

Pets

Sweetie
Sweetie is a dog that first appeared in Dog Days. Greg's dad buys him after discovering that his own father (Greg's grandpa) lied about accidentally running over his childhood dog, Nutty. Sweetie wreaks havoc in the Heffley household and is given to Gramma at the end of the book. In Cabin Fever, Sweetie undergoes drastic weight gain at Gramma's house because he is fed many table scraps. Sweetie is mentioned in The Third Wheel when Greg explains that Manny locks himself in Sweetie's old playpen to avoid interacting with other kids. In Hard Luck, Gramma dresses Sweetie up like a little human. Greg and Rodrick like playing with him by going up behind him and making flatulence sounds. He will then sniff his rear end until he goes to sleep. In The Long Haul, Greg mentions in a flashback where Susan took Sweetie to the vet to get his stomach pumped, because she saw some whoopie pie wrappers on the floor, causing her to think Sweetie ate the whoopie pies, but Greg actually ate them. In The Meltdown, Greg imagines Sweetie sunbathing when Gramma takes him to the beach. In The Deep End, Greg tries to sleep in Gramma's guest room, but Sweetie refuses to share it.

Greg and Rodrick's fish
Greg and Rodrick’s fish are two fish that appeared in "Dog Days", when Greg's mom gives her sons five dollars to buy something they wanted. Greg buys an angelfish that was many different colors, and Rodrick buys a piranha-like fish that was said to be "aggressive". While Greg bought a journal to track everything his fish did, Rodrick neglected his fish to the point of putting its filthy bowl on top of the refrigerator and never feeding it or cleaning it once. When Greg and his family go to a waterpark, Greg's mom puts Rodrick's fish in the same bowl as Greg's fish as it was cleaner. By the time the Heffleys got home, Rodrick's fish had eaten Greg's.

The Pig
The Heffleys’ pet pig was introduced in The Long Haul, in which Manny won it at a country fair for correctly guessing the weight of a hog. In Old School and Double Down, to the annoyance of Greg, the pig exhibits extraordinary intelligence and gains human characteristics. One running gag is that despite not having opposable thumbs, the Pig opens objects such as soda cans. In Double Down, the pig eats a box of candy corn, later to throw up in Rodrick's van. Rodrick then ordered Greg to clean it up, realizing Greg's role in the mess. In The Meltdown, the pig throws a tantrum for being excluded from the trip to Isla de Corales in The Getaway. Frank sends it to obedience school, only for the pig to escape on its second day there. The pig is never found by the Heffleys despite numerous missing posters, and since The Meltdown, the Pig is never seen or mentioned again.

References

Lists of literary characters